Dale Parsons (born c. 1934) is a retired Canadian football player who played for the Calgary Stampeders and Saskatchewan Roughriders. He played college football at the University of Arizona.

References

Living people
1930s births
Players of Canadian football from Saskatchewan
American football centers
Canadian football offensive linemen
Canadian players of American football
Arizona Wildcats football players
Saskatchewan Roughriders players
Calgary Stampeders players
Sportspeople from Regina, Saskatchewan